Paramorpha rhachias is a moth in the Carposinidae family. It is found in Australia, where it has been recorded from New South Wales.

References

Natural History Museum Lepidoptera generic names catalog

Carposinidae
Moths described in 1910